The music of Deltarune comprises multiple soundtrack albums created and scored by Toby Fox. The first soundtrack album was released on Bandcamp on November 1, 2018, a day after the game was launched. In collaboration with Fangamer, Fox released the first chapter's soundtrack on vinyl in 2019.

Releases

Deltarune Chapter 1 OST 

Deltarune Chapter 1 (Original Game Soundtrack) ("Deltarune" stylized in all caps), also known as Deltarune Chapter 1 OST, comprises the music featured in the first chapter of the game.

Deltarune Chapter 2 OST 

Deltarune Chapter 2 (Original Game Soundtrack) ("Deltarune" stylized in all caps), also known as Deltarune Chapter 2 OST, comprises the music featured in the second chapter of the game.

Lena Raine and Marcy Nabors provided additional transcription and arrangement assistance.

Reception 
Adam Luhrs of RPGFan reviewed the soundtrack of Chapter 1 and described it as ranging "up and down the history of video game music" and also noted how the soundtrack "mash[es] disparate elements together". Luhrs also stated that there's "[a] thread of darkness and mystery that weaves through the soundtrack", citing that some of the tracks made him feel "uneasy". Luhrs said that the soundtrack "has a complete arc", and said that the included tracks "spark of creativity and clever thematic structure". The soundtrack for Chapter 1 was nominated for a G.A.N.G. / MAGFEST People's Choice Award in 2019.

Charts

Deltarune Chapter 1 OST

Deltarune Chapter 2 OST

References

External links

Chapter 1 
 Bandcamp
 Spotify

Chapter 2 
 Bandcamp
 Spotify

Video game soundtracks
Undertale